Zoran Rajović (Serbian Cyrillic: Зоран Рајовић; born 28 October 1979) is a Serbian retired professional footballer and coach.

Club career
Born in Vinkovci, SR Croatia, SFR Yugoslavia, Rajović moved to Vojvodina at an early age. He was later sent on loan to Vrbas on two separate occasions. In the summer of 1999, Rajović moved to Bulgaria and joined Beroe Stara Zagora. He scored four league goals in 19 appearances, as the club avoid relegation from the top flight. In 2001, he played in Asia with Dalian Shide F.C. in the Chinese Super League. After a season in East Asia, he played in the First League of FR Yugoslavia with FK Vojvodina. In 2002, he played in the Premier League of Bosnia and Herzegovina and became best remembered for his time with Glasinac Sokolac and Zrinjski Mostar (two spells), becoming the Premier League top scorer in the 2004–05 season with 17 goals.

In 2005, he played in the Israeli Premier League with F.C. Ashdod and Hapoel Kfar Saba F.C. In 2006, he returned to Europe to play in the Football League with Ethnikos Piraeus F.C. and returned to Zrinjski Mostar in 2007. During his second tenure with Zrinjski, he featured in the 2007–08 UEFA Cup against FK Partizan, and FK Rabotnički. He spent time in the Serbian SuperLiga in 2008 with Hajduk Kula, and with Olimpik Sarajevo in 2009. He later had stints with Diagoras F.C., FK Leotar, and FK Rudar Prijedor.

In 2011, he returned to Asia to play with BEC Tero Sasana F.C.in the Thai Premier League, and in the Myanmar National League with Yadanarbon F.C. In 2012, Rajović played in Canadian Soccer League with Serbian White Eagles, scoring 18 goals from 22 appearances. Before retiring from the game, Rajović played for Modriča, Orašje (twice), and Mladost Antin. In 2018, he returned to the Canadian Soccer League to become a player-coach for Scarborough SC.

International career
At the international level, Rajović was capped for FR Yugoslavia at under-18 level. He also featured in two unofficial matches for Bosnia and Herzegovina.

Managerial career
In 2018, he was appointed as a player-coach for Scarborough SC in the Canadian Soccer League. In his debut season as a manager, he led Scarborough to the CSL Championship final but were defeated by FC Vorkuta in a penalty shootout. The following season the club finished as runners-up in the First Division and secured a postseason berth. In the playoffs, Rajović led the eastern Toronto team to the championship finals for the second consecutive season where they defeated FC Ukraine United. In 2020, he secured the First Division title, and reached the championship final against FC Vorkuta, but were defeated by a score of 2-1.

In 2021, Rajović became the assistant coach for the Serbian White Eagles, and shortly after was promoted to head coach. He held this position until April 2022.

Personal life
He holds Serbian, Croatian, and Bosnian-Herzegovinian passports. His father is former Dinamo Vinkovci player Milorad Rajović. Rajović was the agent of footballer Stefan Mitrović.

Honours

Player
Zrinjski Mostar 
 Bosnian Premier League: 2004–05
 Bosnian Cup: 2007–08

Individual
Performance 
 Bosnian Premier League Top Goalscorer: 2004–05 (17 goals)

Manager
Scarborough SC 
 CSL Championship: 2019 
 Canadian Soccer League First Division: 2020

References

External links

 
 

1979 births
Living people
Sportspeople from Vinkovci
Serbs of Croatia
Association football forwards
Croatian footballers
Serbia and Montenegro footballers
Serbian footballers
FK Vojvodina players
FK Vrbas players
PFC Beroe Stara Zagora players
Dalian Shide F.C. players
FK Glasinac Sokolac players
HŠK Zrinjski Mostar players
F.C. Ashdod players
Hapoel Kfar Saba F.C. players
Ethnikos Piraeus F.C. players
FK Hajduk Kula players
FK Olimpik players
Diagoras F.C. players
FK Leotar players
FK Rudar Prijedor players
Zoran Rajovic
Serbian White Eagles FC players
Yadanarbon F.C. players
FK Modriča players
HNK Orašje players
Scarborough SC players
First League of Serbia and Montenegro players
First Professional Football League (Bulgaria) players
Chinese Super League players
Premier League of Bosnia and Herzegovina players
Israeli Premier League players
Football League (Greece) players
Serbian SuperLiga players
Zoran Rajovic
Canadian Soccer League (1998–present) players
Myanmar National League players
Serbia and Montenegro expatriate footballers
Expatriate footballers in Bulgaria
Serbia and Montenegro expatriate sportspeople in Bulgaria
Expatriate footballers in China
Serbia and Montenegro expatriate sportspeople in China
Expatriate footballers in Bosnia and Herzegovina
Serbia and Montenegro expatriate sportspeople in Bosnia and Herzegovina
Expatriate footballers in Israel
Serbia and Montenegro expatriate sportspeople in Israel
Serbian expatriate footballers
Expatriate footballers in Greece
Serbian expatriate sportspeople in Greece
Serbian expatriate sportspeople in Bosnia and Herzegovina
Expatriate footballers in Thailand
Serbian expatriate sportspeople in Thailand
Expatriate soccer players in Canada
Serbian expatriate sportspeople in Canada
Expatriate footballers in Myanmar
Serbian expatriate sportspeople in Myanmar
Serbian football managers
Serbian sports agents
Serbian White Eagles FC managers
Canadian Soccer League (1998–present) managers
Association football player-managers
Association football agents